Alejandro Corona Cervantes (born 26 June 1976) is a former Mexican professional footballer. He last played for Club León in the Liga de Ascenso.

Career
Born in Pachuca, Corona began playing football with Pachuca's reserve team in the Segunda División de México. The club disbanded and he joined Gallos de Aguascalientes which he helped gain promotion to the Primera A. Then, Cruz Azul Hidalgo signed him.

Corona made his Mexican Primera División debut at age 25 with Cruz Azul in 2000. He would also play for Chiapas, Tiburones Rojos de Veracruz and Correcaminos UAT before signing with Club León at age 33. He retired from playing at age 35, and became the youth coach of Esmeraldas de León.

References

External links

1976 births
Living people
Footballers from Hidalgo (state)
Association football midfielders
Cruz Azul footballers
Chiapas F.C. footballers
C.D. Veracruz footballers
Correcaminos UAT footballers
Club León footballers
Mexican footballers